A posthumous award is granted after the recipient has died. Many prizes, medals, and awards can be granted posthumously. Australian actor Heath Ledger, for example, won many awards after his death in 2008. Military decorations, such as Hero of the Russian Federation or the Medal of Honor, are often given posthumously. During World War II, many countries practiced the granting of posthumous awards. Sports awards and titles can be awarded posthumously, for example 1970 Formula One champion Jochen Rindt, who died in a crash late in the season, but still had enough points to be named champion.

Less commonly, certain prizes, medals, and awards are granted only posthumously, especially those that honor people who died in service to a particular cause. Such awards include the
Confederate Medal of Honor award, to Confederate veterans who distinguished themselves conspicuously during the American Civil War (1861–1865), and the Dag Hammarskjöld Medal, to military personnel, police, or civilians who died while serving in a United Nations peacekeeping operation.

See also
 Lists of awards

References

External links
Posthumous award at Law Insider

Awards